David Lawrence Osborn (January 11, 1921 – September 16, 1994) of Tennessee served as Consul General of the United States of America Hong Kong and Macau from August 1970 to March 1974, and as United States Ambassador to Burma from March 1974 to July 1977, immediately following Edwin W. Martin in both positions.  

He received a B.A. from Southwestern University at Memphis in 1940, and an M.A. from Harvard University in 1947.

References

External links
 https://web.archive.org/web/20021117075817/http://www.state.gov/r/pa/ho/po/com/10404.htm
Papers of David L. Osborn, Dwight D. Eisenhower Presidential Library

1921 births
1994 deaths
People from Tennessee
Ambassadors of the United States to Myanmar
Harvard University alumni
Consuls general of the United States in Hong Kong and Macau
United States Foreign Service personnel